Peter Baptist Tadamaro Ishigami, O.F.M. Cap. (Japanese: ペトロ・バプティスタ石神忠真郎; December 1, 1920 – October 25, 2014) was a Japanese prelate of the Catholic Church.

Ishigami was born in Kasari, Japan and ordained a priest on September 6, 1952 for the Order of Friars Minor Capuchin. Ishigami was appointed Bishop of the Diocese of Naha on December 18, 1972 where served until his retirement on January 24, 1997.

References

External links 
 Catholic-Hierarchy
 Diocese of Naha (Japanese)

1920 births
2014 deaths
20th-century Roman Catholic bishops in Japan
People from Kagoshima Prefecture
Capuchin bishops
Japanese Roman Catholic bishops